The 8th Women's Boat Race took place on 11 March 1939. The contest was between crews from the Universities of Oxford and Cambridge and held on the River Thames.

Background
The first Women's Boat Race was conducted on The Isis in 1927.

Race
The race took place along a  stretch of river between Medley Bridge and Godstow along the Upper River Thames.

The contest was won by Oxford by five lengths in a time of 4 minutes 59.4 seconds.  The victory took the overall record in the competition to 6–2 in their favour.

See also
The Boat Race 1939

References

External links
 Official website

Women's Boat Race
1939 in English sport
March 1939 sports events
Boat
Boat
1939 sports events in London